This is a list of nature centers and environmental education centers in the state of Arizona.

To use the sortable tables: click on the icons at the top of each column to sort that column in alphabetical order; click again for reverse alphabetical order.

Resources
 Arizona Association for Environmental Education

External links
 Map of nature centers and environmental education centers in Arizona

 
centers
Arizona
N